Ida Charlotte Clementine Wedel-Jarlsberg  (12 September 1855–29 January 1929) was a Norwegian courtier, artist, temperance activist, pacifist and feminist. She was a lady-in-waiting (hovfröken) of queen Sophia of Sweden.

Biography
She was the daughter of the Norwegian nobleman and landowner count Peder Anker Wedel Jarlsberg (1809–1893) and Hedevig Annette Betzy Sigismunda Anker (1819–1879). She attended the painting school of Knud Bergslien (1873–74) in Kristiania. Afterwards she continued her studies at Karlsruhe with Hans Gude as an instructor. From 1875 to 1877 she stayed in Munich, where she had the painter Eilif Peterssen as her tutor.  

She was appointed as maid of honour to queen Sophia of Sweden-Norway in 1878. She is noted to have been a favorite of the queen among the ladies-in-waiting, along with Märta Eketrä and Ebba von Rosen.   She lost her position as lady-in-waiting in 1885, because she refused to attend a dinner with prime minister Johan Sverdrup as the representative of the queen, her reason being that she disliked the prime minister on political grounds. 

In 1892, she was elected chairman of the temperance- and pacifist society Norske Kvinders Totalavholdsselskap – Det Hvite Bånd.  In 1894, she founded the women's association Unge Kvinners Kristelige Samfund with  Birgitte Esmark (1841-1897).
She visited Italy several times as a painter and lived there permanently from 1916 to 1923. She died during 1929 in Oslo.

References 

1855 births
1929 deaths
Swedish ladies-in-waiting
19th-century Norwegian women artists
Norwegian pacifists
Norwegian feminists
Norwegian temperance activists
Pacifist feminists
19th-century Norwegian painters